Highway 186 (AR 186, Ark. 186, and Hwy. 186) is an east–west state highway in Franklin County, Arkansas. The route of  runs north from Coal Road at Alix through Altus to Philpot Road north of Interstate 40.

Route description
The route begins at County Route 97 (Coal Road) at Alix and runs north and west to Altus. After crossing US 64, AR 186 continues north to pass the Our Lady of Perpetual Help Church, which is listed on the National Register of Historic Places, and enter the Wiederhekr Village corporate limits. The road meets I-40 at exit 41 at a full interchange. Highway 186 continues north to terminate at County Road 90 (Philpot Road).

Major intersections

See also

 List of state highways in Arkansas

References

External links

186
Transportation in Franklin County, Arkansas